The Sumatran treepie or Sunda treepie (Dendrocitta occipitalis) is a species of bird in the family Corvidae. It is endemic to the island of Sumatra in Indonesia. Its natural habitats are subtropical or tropical moist lowland forest and subtropical or tropical moist montane forest. The Bornean treepie (D. cinerascens) is sometimes considered to be a subspecies of this bird.

References

Sumatran treepie
Birds of Sumatra
Sumatran treepie
Taxonomy articles created by Polbot
Taxa named by Salomon Müller